Audimulapu Suresh (born 27 April 1964) is a former civil servant turned politician, and a member of fourteenth Andhra Pradesh Legislative Assembly. He represents Yerragondapalem Constituency in Andhra Pradesh and is a member of Y.S.R. Congress Party. He was a former civil servant. Currently, he is the Minister of Education, Government of Andhra Pradesh under the leadership of Chief Minister of Andhra Pradesh,  Y.S. Jagan Mohan Reddy.

Early life 
He was born to Audimulapu Samuel George, founder of George Group of Institutions at Markapur in Prakasham District. His father had contested in Eleventh Loksabha General Elections from Ongole Constituency. Suresh did his Bachelor's degree in Civil Engineering from National Institute of Technology Karnataka in 1984 and then acquired a doctorate in Computer Science Engineering. He is married to T.H. Vijaya Lakshmi. Previously, he worked as Deputy Financial Officer and Chief Accounts Officer in Indian Railways.

Political career 
He started his political career in the year 2009 by quitting his designation as a civil servant from Indian Railways. He was opted by Congress Party Leader and Chief Minister of Andhra Pradesh Dr. Y.S. Rajasekhara Reddy to be Member of Legislative Assembly for Yerragondapalem Constituency for the term 2009 general elections. He won as Member of Legislative Assembly in the first attempt. Later, he was elected as Member of Legislative Assembly for the Santhanuthalapadu Constituency.

See also 
 Yerragondapalem
 Santhanuthalapadu

References 

1964 births
Andhra Pradesh MLAs 2009–2014
Andhra Pradesh MLAs 2014–2019
Indian civil servants
Living people
YSR Congress Party politicians
Andhra Pradesh MLAs 2019–2024